The year 1993 in architecture involved some significant architectural events and new buildings.

Events
 August 18 – The 14th century Kapellbrücke covered wooden truss bridge in Lucerne (Switzerland) is largely destroyed by fire; rebuilding begins almost immediately.
 Philip Dowson becomes President of the Royal Academy.
 Architekturzentrum Wien founded in Austria.
 van Heyningen and Haward Architects practice formed in London.

Buildings and structures

Buildings opened
 February 23 – Guildford Spectrum, UK
 September 4 – Immaculate Conception Cathedral, Managua, Nicaragua, designed by Ricardo Legorreta
 Het Nieuwe Instituut, Rotterdam, designed by Jo Coenen

Buildings completed

 The Landmark Tower in Yokohama, Japan.
 Hassan II Mosque, Casablanca, Morocco, designed by Michel Pinseau and built by Bouygues.
 Hämeenkylä Church, Vantaa, Finland, designed by Jokela & Kareoja.
 Inner shrine, Ise, Mie, Mie Prefecture, Japan.
 Sanctuary of Divine Mercy (Sanktuarium Miłosierdzia Bożego), Kalisz, Poland (designed 1958; building commenced 1977).
 Museum of Byzantine Culture, Thessaloniki, Greece.
 The Umeda Sky Building in Osaka City, Japan.
 Governor Phillip Tower, Sydney, Australia, by architects Denton Corker Marshall.
 Cave of Niaux visitor entrance in Ariège (department), France, designed by Massimiliano Fuksas.

Awards
 AIA Gold Medal – Thomas Jefferson (posthumous).
 Architecture Firm Award – Cambridge Seven Associates, Inc.
 Grand Prix de l'urbanisme – Bernard Huet.
 Grand prix national de l'architecture – Dominique Perrault.
 Praemium Imperiale Architecture Laureate – Kenzo Tange.
 Pritzker Prize – Fumihiko Maki.
 RAIA Gold Medal – Ken Woolley.
 RIBA Royal Gold Medal – Giancarlo de Carlo.
 Twenty-five Year Award – Deere & Company Administrative Center.
 UIA Gold Medal – Fumihiko Maki.

Births

Deaths
 March 27 – Paul László, Hungarian American architect (born 1900)
 June 27 – Paul Thiry, American architect (born 1904)
 July 13 – Alan McCullough, American modernist architect (born c.1909)
 August 16 – Alison Smithson, English architect (born 1928)
 August 19 – Norman Jaffe, American residential architect (born 1932)
 September 23 – Moshe Mayer, Romanian Israeli architect (born 1909)
 October 24 – Arthur T. Brown, American architect (born 1900)
 December 16 – Charles Moore, American architect (born 1925)

References

 
20th-century architecture